Hirohashi (written: 広橋) is a Japanese surname. Notable people with the surname include:

, Japanese voice actress
, Japanese high jumper

Japanese-language surnames